José María Mendiluce Pereiro (14 April 1951 – 28 November 2015) was a Spanish writer and politician. Born in Madrid, he attended Complutense University in his hometown.

Career
He was awarded the Creu de Sant Jordi in 1996 and the second prize of the Premio Planeta de Novela two years later. Mendiluce represented Spain as a Member of the European Parliament from 1994 to 2004, but before worked in Yugoslavia as a representative of United Nations during the civil war.

Personal life
He came out as gay in 2003, and died in 2015.

References

1951 births
2015 deaths
21st-century Spanish writers
20th-century Spanish writers
20th-century Spanish male writers
Spanish gay writers
MEPs for Spain 1994–1999
MEPs for Spain 1999–2004
Writers from Madrid
Confederation of the Greens MEPs
Spanish Socialist Workers' Party MEPs
Complutense University of Madrid alumni
LGBT legislators in Spain
Gay politicians